Dunia may refer to:

Arts and entertainment
 Dunia (1946 film), an Egyptian film
 Dunia (2005 film), an Egyptian film
 Dunia (album), a 1997 album by Raageshwari Loomba.
 Dunia: Into a New World, a South Korean TV program

People
 Khawla Dunia, Syrian poet, journalist, researcher, activist
 Dunia Ayaso (died 2014), a Spanish screenwriter and film director
 Dunia Elvir (born 1973), Honduran TV journalist and producer
 Dunia Susi (born 1987), English footballer

Other uses
 Dunia Engine and Dunia 2, video game engines developed by Ubisoft

See also

 Dunya (disambiguation)
 Duniya (disambiguation)
 Dunja (disambiguation)
 Donia (disambiguation)
 Donya (disambiguation)